Alex Lewis Drobnitch (November 25, 1913 – June 6, 1960) was an American football player. Drobntich was raised on a farm near Eaton, Colorado. He played college football for the Denver Pioneers football team and was selected by the Newspaper Enterprise Association as a first-team guard on the 1936 College Football All-America Team. He later played professional football for the New York Yanks in 1937, the Buffalo Indians in 1940, and the New York Americans  in 1941. He was inducted into the University of Denver Athletic Hall of Fame in 1996.

References 

1913 births
1960 deaths
American football guards
Denver Pioneers football players
New York Americans (1940 AFL) players
People from Weld County, Colorado
Players of American football from Colorado